Pot Island is one of the Thimble Islands in Branford, Connecticut. It was named for the numerous glacial potholes of various sizes.

References
Wealthy Widow Buying Up Thimbles, "New Haven Register", January 22, 2006, page A1
Half a Mile Off the Coast; Stacey Stowe; "In the Region/Connecticut", New York Times, July 30, 2006; Real Estate page 10.

Thimble Islands